Binibining Pilipinas 2017 was the 54th edition of Binibining Pilipinas. It took place at the Smart Araneta Coliseum in Quezon City, Metro Manila, Philippines on April 30, 2017.

At the end of the event, Maxine Medina crowned Rachel Peters as Miss Universe Philippines 2017, Kylie Verzosa crowned Mariel de Leon as Binibining Pilipinas International 2017, Jennifer Ruth Hammond crowned Katarina Rodriguez as Binibining Pilipinas Intercontinental 2017, Joanna Louise Eden crowned Chanel Olive Thomas as Binibining Pilipinas Supranational 2017, Nicole Cordoves crowned Elizabeth Clenci as Binibining Pilipinas Grand International 2017, and Nichole Marie Manalo crowned Nelda Ibe as Binibining Pilipinas Globe 2017. Charmaine Elima was named 1st Runner-Up and Kristel Guelos was named 2nd Runner-Up.

Results
Color keys
  The contestant was a Runner-up in an International pageant.
  The contestant was a Semi-Finalist in an International pageant.
  The contestant did not place.

§ – Fan Vote winner

Special Awards

National Costume Category 
 The contestant won the Best in National Costume award.

Pageant

Format 
There were several changes in this edition's format. Firstly, there will be 25 semifinalists chosen for the first cut instead of the usual 15. The closed-door interviews and other preliminary activities determined the 25 semifinalists. These 25 semifinalists then competed in the swimsuit and evening gown competitions. Afterward, the semifinalists were narrowed down to 15. The Top 15 includes the winner of the People's Choice Award via text votes. These 15 semifinalists then competed at the Question & Answer portion, where the six winners and the two runners-up were determined.

Judges 
 Paulo Avelino – Actor, model
 Mitzi Borromeo – News anchor and correspondent, CNN Philippines
 H.E. Rodrigo Amaral Souza – Ambassador of Brazil to the Philippines
 Phil Reed – Chief Operations Officer, BPI Holdings Inc.
 Ted Failon – Radio and TV News anchor, ABS-CBN
 Nandy Villar – ABS-CBN Marketing Head
 Gretchen Ho – TV host, former professional volleyball player
 H.E. Franz Jessen – Ambassador of the European Union to the Philippines
 Eric Alberto –  EVP and Chief Revenue Officer, PLDT-Smart, President and Chief Executive Officer of ePLDT

Contestants
40 contestants competed for the six coveted titles.

Notes

Post-pageant Notes 

 Rachel Peters competed at Miss Universe 2017 in Las Vegas, Nevada and finished as a Top 10 finalist. On the other hand, Mariel de Leon competed at Miss International 2017 in Tokyo, Japan where she was unplaced.
 Chanel Olive Thomas competed at Miss Supranational 2017 in Poland and finished as a Top 10 finalist. Thomas also bagged the Miss Friendship award.
 Elizabeth Clenci competed at Miss Grand International 2017 in Phú Quốc, Vietnam and finished as Second Runner-Up. Nelda Ibe on the other hand, competed at Miss Globe 2017 in Tirana, Albania and finished as First Runner-Up.
 Katarina Rodriguez competed at Miss Intercontinental 2017 in Hurghada, Egypt and finished as First Runner-Up. She also won the Miss Media Popularity award and was First Runner-Up in the Best in National Costume award. After her stint at Miss Intercontinental, Rodriguez competed at Miss World Philippines in 2018 where she won Miss World Philippines 2018. She then competed at Miss World 2018 in Sanya, China where she failed to place in the semifinals.
 Jehza Huelar competed again at Binibining Pilipinas 2018 where she won Binibining Pilipinas Supranational 2018. Huelar competed at Miss Supranational 2018 in Krynica-Zdrój, Poland where she finished as a Top 10 finalist.
 After her stint at Binibining Pilipinas, Dindi Pajares competed at Miss World Philippines 2021 where she was appointed as Miss Supranational Philippines 2021. She was voted by her fellow contestants as Miss Supranational Philippines 2021 due to the postponement of the finals night. Pajares then competed at Miss Supranational 2021 where she finished as a Top 12 semifinalist.

References

External links
 Binibining Pilipinas Official website

2017
2017 beauty pageants